Brajendra Kumar Brahma is an author who writes primarily in the Bodo language. He was honored with the Sahitya Akademi Award in 2015 for editing a poetry anthology, Baydi Denkho Baydi Gaab.

References

Recipients of the Sahitya Akademi Award in Bodo
Indian male poets